Katalin Varga (born 12 April 1986) is a Hungarian paracanoeist. She represented Hungary at the 2020 Summer Paralympics.

Career
Varga represented Hungary at the 2020 Summer Paralympics in the women's KL2 event and won a bronze medal.

She competed at the 2021 ICF Canoe Sprint World Championships and won a bronze medal in the women's KL2 event. She competed at the 2022 ICF Canoe Sprint World Championships and again won a bronze medal.

References

1986 births
Living people
Canoeists from Budapest
Hungarian female canoeists
Paracanoeists at the 2020 Summer Paralympics
Medalists at the 2020 Summer Paralympics
Paralympic medalists in paracanoe
Paralympic bronze medalists for Hungary
20th-century Hungarian women
21st-century Hungarian women